The House of Commons Qualification Act 1838 (1 & 2 Vict. c. 48) was an Act of Parliament in the United Kingdom, signed into law on 27 July 1838.

It repealed the Qualification of Members of House of Commons Act 1759 and the Parliament Act 1710.

The Act provided that no person would be capable of being elected as a member of the House of Commons for any county, unless he possessed an estate, or other income, of the clear annual value of £600 over and above any encumbrances. The same provision applied to members for cities or boroughs, and the Cinque Ports, except that in these cases the income needed only be £300 per annum.

Candidates at elections were, if required, to declare to the returning officer (or a commissioner or a justice) that they possessed such estate; this would be certified under a penalty of £100 for a false declaration. If the declaration was found to be false on the advice of an informer, then they would obtain half the penalty.

Every member was to deliver a statement of qualification to the table of the House of Commons and make such a declaration before they could take their seat or vote; a false declaration would make them guilty of a misdemeanour.

If the member took his seat, or voted, before complying with the provisions of this Act, then his election would be considered void. The Act did not extend to the members for university constituencies, or to the eldest sons of peers.

References
The British almanac of the Society for the Diffusion of Useful Knowledge, for the year 1839. The Society for the Diffusion of Useful Knowledge, London, 1839.

1838 in British law
United Kingdom Acts of Parliament 1838
Election law in the United Kingdom
Election legislation
Acts of the Parliament of the United Kingdom concerning the House of Commons